A circuit breaker analyzer is an instrument that measures the parameters of a circuit breaker.

In 1984, Megger patented a digital circuit breaker analyzer, controlled by a microprocessor. in 2020 few companies develop software to control circuit breaker analyzers from different devices such as computers, tablet computer, smartphones and others.

The following tests can be carried out on the circuit breaker: mechanical, thermal, dielectric, short-circuit.

The analyzer operates the circuit breaker under fault current conditions. After finishing the test of the breaker, the system measures currents, voltages and other main parameters of the breaker and through a set algorithm diagnoses the condition of the device under different conditions. The final result of the analysis give information about trip times, essential synchronism of the poles in the different operations of the circuit breaker.

Measured values 
 Timing measurements
 Motion measurements
 Coil currents
 Dynamic resistance measurement (DRM)
 Vibration analysis
 Dynamic capacitance measurement
 Static and dynamic resistance measurement

References 

Electronic test equipment
Product testing
Measuring instruments